The Enid and Tonkawa Railway Company' was incorporated on March 20, 1899, under the laws of the territory of Oklahoma.  The company constructed a railroad line from North Enid, Oklahoma, to Billings, Oklahoma. The Chicago, Rock Island and Pacific Railroad purchased the company on December 22, 1899. Rock Island completed the line from North Enid to Tonkawa, Oklahoma.

References

Defunct Oklahoma railroads
Railway companies established in 1899
Railway companies disestablished in 1899
Railway companies in Enid, Oklahoma
1899 establishments in Oklahoma Territory